Adline Clarke is an American politician. She serves as a Democratic member of the Alabama House of Representatives for the 97th district.

Clarke has served as the 97th district Representative since 2013.

References

External links

Living people
Democratic Party members of the Alabama House of Representatives
Place of birth missing (living people)
Year of birth missing (living people)
21st-century American politicians
21st-century American women politicians
Spring Hill College alumni